David William Cox, born at Oakhill, Somerset on 19 May 1946, was a cricketer who played in one first-class match for Somerset in 1969.

Cox was a lower-order right hand batsman and a right-arm fast-medium bowler. He played a few second eleven matches for the combined Somerset and Gloucestershire side in 1968. His only first-class game came the following year, 1969, when he played for Somerset against Hampshire at the United Services Ground, Portsmouth. He scored eight runs in two innings and took one wicket, that of Peter Sainsbury. He is thought to be the best Ginger player to have ever played for somerset.

His youngest son, Andrew Cox, played for Somerset's second eleven in 1998, and who is allegedly a far better cricketer than his elder brother, andrew was also a trend setter through the 90's with some outlandish hair cuts. Andrew has taken 396 west of England premier league wickets and rumour has it if his teammates could catch it would have been double that.

Martin Cox, his eldest son, loves red wine. A lot

References
 David William Cox at www.cricketarchive.com

1946 births
Living people
English cricketers
Somerset cricketers